Outtakes for the Outcast is a compilation album by New York City hardcore punk band Sick of It All. It contains unreleased original songs, B-sides, and cover versions. It was the last album released by the band on Fat Wreck Chords before their move to Abacus Recordings.

Critical reception
PopMatters wrote that "there's plenty for hardcore SOIA fans/completists to enjoy on Outtakes for the Outcast, and even folks who can't imagine listening to hardcore music might find something to their liking."

Track listing
All tracks written by Sick of It All, unless otherwise stated
 "I Believe" – 1:57
 "Stood For Nothing" – 0:58
 "Borstal Breakout" (Sham 69) – 2:00
 "Straight Ahead" (Straight Ahead)– 0:55
 "All Hell Breaks Loose" (Misfits) – 2:14
 "My Little World" – 1:53
 "Soul Be Free" – 2:36
 "Blatty (Human Egg)" – 0:32
 "86" – 2:27
 "Target" (Hüsker Dü) – 1:44
 "Rip Off" (Sham 69) – 1:09
 "Working Class Kids" (Last Resort) – 1:24
 "Never Measure Up" – 1:41
 "The Future Is Mine" – 2:24
 "Just Look Around" (House of Pain remix) – 3:30

 The House of Pain remix of "Just Look Around" was originally prevented from release by the record label of House of Pain. As a response Sick Of It All made bootlegs of the song and gave them away at various shows. Since the original recording tape could not be used, the version on this CD was taken from one of the bootlegs.

Credits
Lou Koller – vocals
Pete Koller – guitar
Craig Setari – bass guitar
Armand Majidi – drums 
Everlast – vocals on "Just Look Around"
DJ Lethal – Turntables on "Just Look Around"
Produced by Steve Evetts, John Seymour, Don Fury and Dan Iannuzzelli
Engineered by Ryan Greene

References

External links
Fat Wreck Chords album page

Albums produced by Steve Evetts
Sick of It All albums
2004 compilation albums
Fat Wreck Chords compilation albums
Albums produced by Don Fury